The 2012 African U-20 Women's World Cup Qualifying Tournament was the 6th edition of the African U-20 Women's World Cup Qualifying Tournament, the biennial international youth football competition organised by the Confederation of African Football (CAF) to determine which women's under-20 national teams from Africa qualify for the FIFA U-20 Women's World Cup.

19 teams entered the competition, but due to withdrawals only 16 actually played matches. The top two teams of the tournament Ghana and Nigeria qualified for the 2012 FIFA U-20 Women's World Cup in Japan as the CAF representatives.

Preliminary round
The preliminary round was played on 28 and 29 October 2011 (first leg) and 19 November 2011 (second leg). Guinea withdrew from competition before the start of the 1st leg. As a result, Sierra Leone qualified for the next round. Comoros withdrew from competition before the start of the 2nd leg. As a result, Botswana qualified for the next round.

|}

Kenya won 4−2 on aggregate and advanced to the first round.

Botswana won on walkover after Comoros did not appear for the second leg and advanced to the first round.

Sierra Leone won on walkover after Guinea did not appear for the first leg and advanced to the first round.

First round
The first round was held on 17–19 February 2012 (first leg) and 2–3 March 2012 (second leg). Sierra Leone withdrew from competition before the start of the 1st leg due to a lack of funds. As a result, Nigeria qualified for the next round.

|}

Zimbabwe won 7−0 on aggregate and advanced to the second round.

Mali won 6−1 on aggregate and advanced to the second round.

DR Congo won 3−2 on aggregate and advanced to the second round.

Kenya won 5−2 on aggregate and advanced to the second round.

Tunisia won 5−1 on aggregate and advanced to the second round.

South Africa won 7−2 on aggregate and advanced to the second round.

Ghana won 10−0 on aggregate and advanced to the second round.

Nigeria won on walkover after Sierra Leone did not appear for the first leg and advanced to the second round.

Second round
The second round was held on 30–31 Mar or 1 Apr (first leg) and 13–15 April 2012 (second leg).

|}

Tunisia won 4−2 on aggregate and advanced to the third round.

Ghana won 5−0 on aggregate and advanced to the third round.

Nigeria won 6−0 on aggregate and advanced to the third round.

RD Congo won 6−3 on aggregate and advanced to the third round.

Third round
The third round was held on 4–6 May 2012 (first leg) and 18–20 May 2012 (second leg). The winners of the two third round matches qualified directly to the 2012 FIFA U-20 Women's World Cup held in Japan.

|}

Ghana won 7−2 on aggregate and qualified to 2012 FIFA U20 W-WC.

Nigeria won 7−0 on aggregate and qualified to 2012 FIFA U20 W-WC.

Qualified teams for FIFA U-20 Women's World Cup
The following two teams from CAF qualified for the FIFA U-20 Women's World Cup.

References

External links
 Official schedule and results
 Results at futbol24.com

African U-20 Women's World Cup qualification
CAF
Wom
2012 in youth association football